Miami County Courthouse may refer to:

 Miami County Courthouse (Indiana), Peru, Indiana
 Miami County Courthouse (Kansas), Paola, Kansas
 Miami County Courthouse (Ohio), Troy, Ohio